Bridge Asia Japan (BAJ) is a non-profit organization which is aimed to contribute to the benefit of refugees, disabled people, women and children et al all over Asia. It was established in 1993 in Japan.It has worked in Myanmar and Vietnam.

References

External links
BAJ Home Page

References

1993 establishments in Japan
Foreign charities operating in Vietnam
Development charities based in Japan